Ephemera is a Norwegian pop trio from Bergen. Formed in 1994, it consists of Christine Sandtorv, Inger-Lise Størksen and Jannicke Larsen.

History
Their first album, Glue, was released in 1996.

After several years of touring, studying music, and writing new songs, a second album, Sun, was released in 2000. That album earned the band a Best Group nomination in the Spellemannprisen awards, Norway's equivalent of the Grammy Awards.

Three more albums were released across the next five years, and the band won the Spellemannprisen award in the category Best Pop Album for the album Balloons and Champagne (2002) and Air (2003).

The band was an essential part of the defining "Bergensbølgen"
(The Bergen Wave) that heavily influenced Norwegian music and paved the way for a new international recognition of Norwegian music and up and coming artists. Ephemera earned a solid fan base in Northern Europe and in Asia, and they have been an immense inspiration for new Norwegian artists now seen on stages in Norway and around the world. Their music is also found in films, commercials and TV-series.

The band took a break in 2005 after extensive touring. The break however, was extended several times to give room for new professional careers and solo albums, in addition to family extensions. After two fully booked concerts in Oslo and Bergen in 2015 and 2016, the break finally seemed to reach an end. 
 
Since 2017 they have spent time in studio with their long-time producer Yngve Saetre, and in June 2019 they released their new single MAGIC – the first taste of their new compositions.

Members
Christine Sandtorv – vocal, guitar, keyboards, songwriter
Jannicke Larsen – vocal, guitar, keyboards, percussion, songwriter
Inger Lise Størksen – vocal, percussion, chimes, songwriter

Honors
 The Alarm Music Prize (2003)
 Spellemannprisen nominations (Best Pop Album for Sun in 2001, Balloons and Champagne in 2003)

Discography
 1996: Glue
 2000: Sun
 2001: Balloons and Champagne
 2003: Air
 2005: Monolove

See also

 List of all-female bands
 List of alternative-rock bands
 List of Norwegian musicians
 Music of Norway

External links 
 , the band's official website
 
 Kaasen, Anders (undated).  "Ephemera: Biography".  Rovi (via MSN Entertainment).  Retrieved 28 January 2013.
 

1994 establishments in Norway
20th-century Norwegian musicians
21st-century Norwegian musicians
All-female bands
Easy listening musicians
Musical groups established in 1994
Musical groups from Bergen
Norwegian musical trios
Norwegian alternative rock groups
Norwegian electronic music groups
Spellemannprisen winners
20th-century women musicians
21st-century women musicians